Morimotoidius is a genus of ground beetles in the family Carabidae. There are about five described species in Morimotoidius.

Species
These five species belong to the genus Morimotoidius:
 Morimotoidius astictus (Bates, 1883)  (Japan)
 Morimotoidius cavicola Wang; Pang & Tian, 2016  (China)
 Morimotoidius formosus Habu, 1954  (Taiwan)
 Morimotoidius otuboi (Habu, 1944)  (Japan)
 Morimotoidius zhushandong Pang & Tian, 2014  (China)

References

Platyninae